Tim Moses (born 1 December 1994) is an English cricketer. He made his first-class debut on 28 March 2017 for Cambridge MCCU against Nottinghamshire as part of the Marylebone Cricket Club University fixtures.

References

External links
 

1994 births
Living people
English cricketers
Cambridge University cricketers
People from Lewes
Cambridge MCCU cricketers
Cambridgeshire cricketers